The Executive Board of the European Central Bank is the organ responsible for implementing monetary policy for the Eurozone  in line with the guidelines and decisions taken by the Governing Council of the European Central Bank.

The Executive Board consists of the President, the Vice-President and four other members, one of whom concurrently serves as ECB chief economist. All members are appointed by the European Council  by qualified majority for a non-renewable eight-year term. As an exception, the officeholders appointed to the original Board received staged terms so that one would be replaced each year. Under the ECB's rules board members do not represent a particular country, nor are they responsible for keeping track of economic conditions in one country. Instead, all board members are jointly responsible for monetary policy for the entire Euro area.

Current members
The current members of the ECB Executive Board are as follows:

List of Board members
The following is a list of past and present members of the Executive Board of the European Central Bank. A member serves for a non renewable term of eight year. Since the ECB was established in 1998, the following people have served as Executive Board members:

Status

Italics denotes date of term ending

Succession of seats

References

External links
European Central Bank: Executive Board

Executive Board